The 2010–11 TFF Second League (also known as Spor-Toto Second League due to sponsorship reasons) is the 10th season of the league since its establishment in 2001 as the third level division; and the 48th season of the second league  in Turkish football since its establishment in 1963–64 (before 2001 league was played as second level division).

League was played with 36 teams, 18 in White group and 18 in Red group. Winner of each group promoted to 2011–12 TFF First League. A play off series were played among best four teams in each group to determine the third team to promote. Bottom three teams in each groups  relegated to 2011–12 TFF Third League.

League was started on 29 August 2010 and ended on 8 May 2011. Promotion play-offs were played on 16–22 May 2011.

Teams

Team summaries

Note: By the end of the season

White Group

White Group league table

White Group positions by round

White Group results

White Group top goalscorers
Including matches played on 8 May 2011;Source: TFF Second League page

Red Group

Red Group league table

Red Group positions by round

Red Group results

Red Group top goalscorers
Including matches played on 8 May 2011;Source: TFF Second League page.

Promotion playoffs
In each group, teams ranked second through fifth will compete in the promotion playoffs for the 2011–12 TFF First League. The 2nd team and 5th team, and 3rd and 4th teams will play one match in a neutral venue. Winners will play finals. Winner of the final will be third team to promote to TFF First League 2011-2012.

Quarter-finals

Semi-final

Final

References

See also
 2010–11 Türkiye Kupası
 2010–11 Süper Lig
 2010–11 TFF First League
 2010–11 TFF Third League

TFF Second League seasons
3
Turkey